Weinmannia exigua is a species of plant in the family Cunoniaceae. It is endemic to Fiji. This scarce shrub or small tree occurs in an area with a high risk of fires.

References

exigua
Endemic flora of Fiji
Critically endangered flora of Oceania
Taxonomy articles created by Polbot